Sifted (formerly VeriShip) is a logistics company headquartered in Kansas City, Missouri, having been previously headquartered in Overland Park, Kansas.

History 

 Sifted was founded in 2005
 In 2015, the company announced a move to Overland Park, Kansas.
 In July 2015, Sifted launched a cloud-based parcel tracking platform.
 In December 2019, Sifted acquired Valence, an Utah-based company that tracks packages shipped by Amazon.
 In October 2020, VeriShip merged with Sifted.

References

Technology companies of the United States